This is a list of churches in Powys, Wales.

Active churches

Defunct churches 

Powys